"I'm Not Human" is a song by American rapper and singer XXXTentacion featuring fellow American rapper and singer Lil Uzi Vert. A posthumous track, the single was released on what would have been XXXTentacion's 25th birthday.

Background 
On January 22, 2023, XXXTentacion's estate announced on his social media that the posthumous single "I'm Not Human" featuring Lil Uzi Vert would be released the next day, January 23, 2023, which would have been X's 25th birthday. The song features an acoustic background with X and Lil Uzi Vert singing about their sentimental emotions and how they feel that their feelings are obscure to others. In 2021, when Lil Uzi Vert was asked why they had never worked on a posthumous collaboration with X, they stated, 

Lil Uzi Vert stated in 2022 that while X was alive, they saw X as their "only competition".

For unknown reasons, "I'm Not Human" was removed from X's channel. As of February 2023, the single has not been released to any streaming platforms, except "Very Rare Forever Freestyle", which was released on Spotify.

Personnel 
Credits adapted from Genius.

 XXXTentacion – artist, songwriter
 Lil Uzi Vert – artist, songwriter
 John Cunningham – songwriter, producer

References

External links 
Audio on YouTube

2023 singles
2023 songs
XXXTentacion songs
Lil Uzi Vert songs
Songs written by XXXTentacion
Songs written by Lil Uzi Vert
Empire Distribution singles
Songs released posthumously